Nicole Dyer Griffith is a former Miss Universe Trinidad and Tobago. After her reign as Miss Trinidad and Tobago she moved into the corporate sphere to become the Group Corporate Communications Manager at ANSA McAl Group of Companies. Nicole Dyer Griffith served as Senator and Parliamentary Secretary in the Ministry of Foreign Affairs and Communication.

Biography 
Griffith became the Group Corporate Communications Manager at  ANSA McAL Group of Companies in Feb 2007 where she remained until Nov 2010. She has also served as the Senator and Parliamentary Secretary In the Ministry of Foreign Affairs and Communication.

Griffith is the former chair of the political party, Congress of the People (COP). She was also the leader of the political party the Alliance of Independents (AOI).

Griffith is the founder of The O2N Foundation, also known as the Oxygen with Nicole Foundation, a non-profit organization. In addition, she is patron of the Diabetes Association of Trinidad and Tobago.

Personal life 
Griffith is the wife of Gary Griffith, the commissioner of the Trinidad and Tobago Police Service.

References

External links 
 Official Website

Year of birth missing (living people)
Living people
21st-century Trinidad and Tobago women politicians
21st-century Trinidad and Tobago politicians
Members of the Senate (Trinidad and Tobago)
Congress of the People (Trinidad and Tobago) politicians